The 1997 Cork Intermediate Hurling Championship was the 88th staging of the Cork Intermediate Hurling Championship since its establishment by the Cork County Board in 1909. The draw for the opening fixtures took place on 8 December 1996. The championship began on 22 June 1997 and ended on 2 November 1997.

On 2 November 1997, Cloyne won the championship after a 1-12 to 1-07 defeat of Delanys in the final at Páirc Uí Chaoimh. It was their third championship title overall and their first title since 1970.

Milford's Dan O'Brien was the championship's top scorer with 1-29.

Team changes

From Championship

Promoted to the Cork Senior Hurling Championship
 Newtownshandrum

To Championship

Promoted from the Cork Junior A Hurling Championship
 Argideen Rangers

Regraded from the Cork Senior Hurling Championship
 Milford
 Youghal

Results

First round

Second round

Quarter-final

Semi-finals

Final

Championship statistics

Top scorers

Top scorers overall

Top scorers in a single game

References

Cork Intermediate Hurling Championship
Cork Intermediate Hurling Championship